St. David's Church may refer to:

Australia
 St Davids Anglican Church, Allora, Queensland
 St David's Church, Toongabbie, Victoria

Ireland
 St David's Church, Naas, County Kildare

United Kingdom 
 England
 St David's Church, Exeter
 St David's Church, Haigh
 St David's Church, Highgate, Birmingham
 St David's Church, Shenley Green
 Scotland
 St David's Church, Dalkeith
 St David's Parish Church, Knightswood, Glasgow
 Wales
 St David's Church, Barmouth
 St David's Church, Bettws
 Eglwys Dewi Sant, Cardiff
 St David's Church (Eglwys Dewi Sant), Carmarthen
 St David's Welsh Church, Colwyn Bay
 St David's Church, Connah's Quay
 St David's Church, Laleston
 Church of St David, Llanddewi Skirrid
 St. David's Church, Llanfaes
 St David's Church, Llangeview
 Church of St David, Llanthony, Monmouthshire
 Church of St David's, Llywel, Powys
 St David's Welsh Church, Rhosllannerchrugog

United States 
 St. David Catholic Church (Madawaska, Maine)
 St. David's Episcopal Church (Radnor, Pennsylvania)
 St. David's Episcopal Church (Rayville, Louisiana)
 Belgrade and St. David's Church, Creswell, North Carolina
 St. David's Episcopal Church and Cemetery, Cheraw, South Carolina
 St. David's Episcopal Church (Austin, Texas)